Kyaw Swar Linn(Oh'myPheePhee) (born 20 December 2004) is a footballer from Burma who plays as a midplayer for Bago United.

References

1991 births
Living people
Burmese footballers
Association football defenders